The 2005 World Fencing Championships were held in Leipzig, Germany. The event took place from October 9 to October 15, 2005.

Medal summary

Men's events

Women's events

Medal table

External links
FIE Results

World Fencing Championships
W
Fencing Championships
Fencing Championships
October 2005 sports events in Europe
2000s in Saxony
Sports competitions in Leipzig